Carsten Thomassen may refer to:
 Carsten Thomassen (mathematician)
 Carsten Thomassen (journalist)